Tisis mendicella is a moth in the family Lecithoceridae. It was described by Francis Walker in 1864. It is found in Sri Lanka.

The forewings are dark fuscous with two or three short whitish streaks from the base and transverse lines of white irroration (sprinkling) at one-fourth and one-third, partly marked with orange. There are three orange longitudinal streaks from about the middle to three-fourths, the third furcate (forked) posteriorly, separated by streaks of purplish-leaden suffusion. Veins 3, 4, and 7 to 10 are marked more or less completely with white streaks, 5 and 6 with orange streaks and there is a short white streak along the costa near the apex. The hindwings are dark fuscous, with a subdorsal groove enclosing a pencil of whitish-ochreous hairs.

References

Moths described in 1864
Moths of Sri Lanka
Tisis
Taxa named by Francis Walker (entomologist)